East Croachy is a small hamlet in the Highland council area, in the Highlands of Scotland. The B851 road passes through it. St Paul's Episcopal Church, known as "the grouse church" because of increased attendances during the grouse shooting season, is located in East Croachy. Also nearby is Tomintoul House, a B listed house built by architect William Robertson in 1841.

References

Populated places in Inverness committee area